John Shute may refer to:
John Shute (architect) (died 1563), English architect and miniaturist
John Shute Barrington, 1st Viscount Barrington (1678–1734), English lawyer and theologian, born John Shute 
John W. Shute (1840–1922), American banker
Sir John Shute (politician) (1873–1948), British politician and businessman